Didier Cabestany (13 May 1969 – 16 February 2020) was a French professional rugby league footballer who represented France at the 1995 World Cup.

Cabestany played for Paris Saint-Germain in the 1996 and 1997 Super League competitions and later played for UTC.

References

1969 births
2020 deaths
Catalans Dragons players
France national rugby league team captains
France national rugby league team players
French rugby league players
French rugby union players
Paris Saint-Germain Rugby League players
Place of birth missing
Rugby league props
Rugby league second-rows
Sportspeople from Perpignan